Rachel "Chelli" Goldenberg (born May 25, 1954 in Tel Aviv) is an Israeli actress, model, blogger and writer.

Biography 
Goldenberg was born and raised in Tel Aviv, Israel, to family of Jewish background. At age 16, Goldenberg began a modeling career. Goldberg became one of the leading Israeli models during the 1970s and 1980s. In 1973, Goldenberg was enlisted to the IDF and served in the Israeli Air Force.

In 1977, she appeared in Menahem Golan's film Operation Thunderbolt. Her big break as an actress occurred in 1978 when she starred in the Israeli cult film Ha-Lahaka. In 1979, she appeared in Dizengoff 99. Afterward, she studied in New York City at the Stella Adler Studio of Acting and the Lee Strasberg Theatre and Film Institute.

During the 1980s and 1990s, she took part in various films and advertisements, including a series of advertisements for the Israeli dairy pudding "Milky", for the Israeli food products brand Telma, and for the Israeli-based telecommunications company "Pelephone". During those years she appeared in The Delta Force (1986), Abba Ganuv 3, and the TV movie Hatulot Hara'am (1998). 

During the 2000s, she participated in several TV series including Brown Girls, and Esti HaMekho'eret. Goldenberg also hosted a live variety style TV show called Our Life. Through the years, she released two children's books - her first book called "Smiles" was published in the mid-1990s by Ma'ariv. In 2004, she released her second book called "The Colored Dots of Compulsive Beetle", published by Yediot Aharonot. In 2006, she began writing a blog as well as a column in the printed edition of Yediot Ahronot.

Personal life 
Goldenberg was married to Israeli television host Avri Gilad; the couple has one daughter. Goldenberg resides in the neighborhood of Afeka, Tel Aviv.

Children's books 
 Smiles (published by Ma'ariv)
 The Colored Dots of Piti the Beetle (Yediot Aharonot, 2004)

Filmography 
 Operation Thunderbolt (1977)
 Ha-Lahaka (1978)
 Dizengoff 99 (1979)
 The Cowards (1980)
 The Ambassador (1982)
 Girls (1985)
 Abba Ganuv 3 (1991)
 Closing Doors Quietly (1994)
 Hatulot Hara'am (1997)
 One Small Step (2003)

Notable Television Appearances:
 Losing Alice (2020) as Tami
 Ad Hachatuna (2010) as Dede Sadot
 HaEi (2009) as Liz
 Hashoofim (2008) as Malca Lev-Ari
 Esti HaMechoeret (2004) as Ruti Caspi
 Bnot Brown (2002) as Miri Kraus
 Sipurim Kzarim Al Ahava as (1998)

References

External links 
 
 Chelli Goldenberg's Blog (Hebrew)

1954 births
Living people
Jewish Israeli actresses
Jewish female models
Models from Tel Aviv
Actresses from Tel Aviv
Israeli female models
Israeli film actresses
Israeli television actresses